Nepinalone is a cough suppressant. Its brand names include Placatus, Tussolvina, and Nepitus.

The effect is evident after 20–30 minutes after administration and persists for at least 4 hours. It acts primarily at the level of the CNS, but also shows a slight activity in inhibiting the bronchospasm. In such use, it is less effective than codeine and more effective than dextromethorphan in inhibiting the tussive stimulus.

Synthesis

The starting material is called 2-Phenylpropanoyl Chloride [22414-26-2]. This is reacted with ethylene in the presence of aluminum trichloride catalyst to give 1-methyl-2-tetralone [66405-14-9] (1). Base catalyzed alkylation of this with 1-(2-chloroethyl)piperidine [1932-03-2] (2) gives Nepinalone (3).

References

Antitussives
1-Piperidinyl compounds
Ketones
Tetralins